Aeroflot Flight 1491 was a scheduled domestic passenger flight from Moscow-Vnukovo Airport to Kharkiv Airport in the USSR that crashed on 18 May 1972 while descending to land in Kharkiv, killing all 122 passengers and crew aboard the Antonov An-10.

Aircraft and crew

Aircraft 
Antonov An-10A, registration СССР-11215 (factory number 0402502, MSN 25-02), was manufactured at the Voronezh Aviation Plant on 3 February 1961. On 7 February 1961 it was delivered to Aeroflot's Kharkiv division. It was equipped with 4 turboprop Ivchenko AI-20 engines. At the time of the accident, the aircraft accumulated 11,105 flight cycles and 15,483 flying hours.

Crew 
The flight crew responsible flying the aircraft was from the 87th Flight Squad (Kharkiv United Squadron). Captain Vladimir Vasiltsov was in charge of this flight; first officer Andrei Burkovskii, navigator Aleksandr Grishko, flight engineer Vladimir Shchokin, and radio operator Konstantin Peresechanskii were also in the flight deck.

Synopsis
Flight 1491 took off from Moscow-Vnukovo Airport at 10:39 en route to Kharkiv in the Ukrainian SSR. The fuselage then plunged into a wooded area, killing all 114 passengers and 8 crew on board the aircraft.

Aftermath
Pravda reported on the crash of Flight 1491 shortly after it happened. At the time, it was unusual in the Soviet Union for there to be press reports on domestic air crashes.

The probable cause of the crash was determined to be the center wing section failing due to a fatigue crack in the lower central wing panel.

Following this accident, Aeroflot ceased the operation of An-10.

See also

Aeroflot accidents and incidents in the 1970s
Aeroflot Flight 1969

References

External links
Aeroflot Flight 1491 at planecrashinfo.com

Aviation accidents and incidents in 1972
1972 in the Soviet Union
Aviation accidents and incidents in the Soviet Union
Airliner accidents and incidents caused by in-flight structural failure
Accidents and incidents involving the Antonov An-10
1491
May 1972 events in Europe
Aviation accidents and incidents in Ukraine
History of Kharkiv
1972 in Ukraine